Sandfly fever can refer to:

 Visceral leishmaniasis, or kala-azar 
 Pappataci fever, or Papatasi fever, an acute febrile arboviral infection (most commonly referred to if not otherwise specified)